Brian Foster may refer to:

Brian Foster (fighter) (born 1984), American mixed martial artist 
Brian Foster (ice hockey) (born 1987), American professional ice hockey goaltender 
Brian Foster (BMX rider) (born 1972), American motocross racer  
Brian Foster (lawyer), worked on behalf of Guantanamo captive Muktar Yahya Najee al-Warafi
Brian Foster (physicist) (born 1954), British physicist
 Brian Foster, husband of Mrs Arlene Foster

See also
Bryan Foster of Offbeats